Marriottella sepsoides is a species of tephritid or fruit flies in the genus Marriottella of the family Tephritidae. They have a wing length of less than 2 mm and feed on the flowerheads of  Helichrysum. They are mainly found in South Africa.

References

Tephritinae
Insects described in 2006
Diptera of Africa